Mandhana Junction railway station is a small railway station in Kanpur district, Uttar Pradesh. Its code is MDA. It serves Kanpur city. The station consists of a single platform. The platform is not well sheltered. It lacks many facilities including water and sanitation.

Trains 

 Kanpur–Farukhabad Passenger
 –Kasganj Passenger
 Allahabad–Farukhabad Passenger

Development

Indian Railways has planned to discard the railway line from Anwarganj to Mandhana and connect Mandhana Junction with  thus Mandhana will become an important railway station in north-western Kanpur. There are plans to operate trains from Bithoor to New Delhi and towards Mumbai via Rajasthan by connecting Mandhana with Howrah–Delhi main line near Panki.

References

Railway stations in Kanpur
M
Railway stations in Kanpur Nagar district
Railway junction stations in Uttar Pradesh